Eye pillows, also known as dream pillows, are mask-shaped or rectangular pouches made from a fabric such as cotton or silk and filled with scented or non-scented herbs.

Uses
At one time, eye pillows were called comfort pillows and were used in sick rooms to ease nightmares and to disguise the scent of illness. Herbs such as flax seed, lavender, chamomile, eucalyptus, and rose petals were used as fillers in eye pillows to help comfort the sick and ease them to sleep. Lavender is said to be a natural anti-depressant and to help with insomnia, stress, and headaches.

Eye pillows are typically used to shield the eyes from light and to apply a gentle, relaxing weight over and around the eyes. They are also used to stimulate the oculocardiac reflex and lower the heart rate, helping to activate the parasympathetic nervous system.

See also
 Sachet (scented bag)

References

External links
 How To Make An Eye Pillow
 Memory Foam Pillows For Neck Pain
  What Is An Eye Pillow?

Pillows